Ishan Pandey (born 2 March 1998) is a Nepalese cricketer who is a left-handed opening batsman. He has previously played for the Nepal under-19 cricket team.

In September 2019, he was named in Nepal's squad for the 2019–20 Singapore Tri-Nation Series and the 2019–20 Oman Pentangular Series. He made his T20I debut for Nepal, against Zimbabwe, in the Singapore Tri-Nation Series on 27 September 2019. In November 2019, he was named in Nepal's squad for the 2019 ACC Emerging Teams Asia Cup in Bangladesh.

References

External links
 

1998 births
Living people
Nepalese cricketers
Nepal Twenty20 International cricketers
People from Syangja District